Scaphyglottis imbricata is a species of orchid found from Mexico to northern and western South America.

References

External links

imbricata
Orchids of Mexico